The Zélée Subglacial Trench is a subglacial valley on George V Coast, running north-northeast to south-southwest and coinciding with the trough cut by the Mertz Glacier. The feature was delineated by the Scott Polar Research Institute (SPRI)-NSF-TUD airborne radio echo sounding program, 1967–79, and named after the corvette Zélée  (Lt. Charles Jacquinot) of the French expedition of 1837–40 under Capt. Jules Dumont d'Urville.

References

Valleys of Antarctica
Landforms of George V Land